The Caxcan are an ethnic group who are indigenous to western and north-central Mexico, particularly the regions corresponding to modern-day Zacatecas, southern Durango, Jalisco, Colima, Aguascalientes, Nayarit. The Caxcan language is most often documented as an ancient variant of Nahuatl and is a member of the Uto-Aztecan language family. The last generation of natively fluent Caxcan language speakers came to an end in the 1890s. Despite this having long been conflated by anthropologists with an extinction of the Caxcan people themselves, much of Caxcan culture has persisted via oral tradition. There is currently an ongoing revitalization of Caxcan language, scholarship, and culture.

History

Pre-1550 
The Caxcan were a partly nomadic, partly sedentary people. Under their leader, Tenamaztle, the Caxcan were allied with the Zacatecos against the Spaniards during the Mixtón Rebellion in 1540-42. During the rebellion, they were described as "the heart and the center of the Indian Rebellion". After the rebellion, they were a constant target of the Zacatecos and Guachichiles due to their ceasefire agreement with the Spaniards. Their principal religious and population centers were at Teul, Tlaltenango, Juchipila, and Teocaltiche.

Over time, the Caxcans lost their culture due to warfare, disease, and marriage to non-Caxcans. Also, most of the Caxcans were sent into slavery by the Spanish to work in silver mines. During the colonial period, many Spanish (and some Basque settlers) had intermarried, or had relations, with the Caxcans making many Caxcan descendants Mestizos. The allied tribes and Mestizos settled the Caxcan lands in Zacatecas and Jalisco.

Their elected rulers were called tlatoani. Caxcan society was divided up into several different city-states.

The Chichimeca War (1550-1590) 

The Chichimeca War (1550–1590) was a military conflict waged between Spanish colonizers and their Indian allies against a confederation of Chichimeca Indians. It was the longest and most expensive conflict between Spaniards and the indigenous peoples of New Spain in the history of the colony.

The Chichimeca wars began eight years after the Mixtón Rebellion (1540–1542). It can be considered as a continuation of that rebellion as the fighting did not come to a halt in the intervening years. Unlike in the Mixtón rebellion, the Caxcanes were now allied with the Spanish. The war was fought in the Bajío region known as La Gran Chichimeca, specifically in the Mexican states of Zacatecas, Guanajuato, Aguascalientes, Jalisco, and San Luis Potosi.

1900-2000 
The Council of the Caxcan indigenous people was formed in the 1920s by Juana Belén Gutiérrez de Mendoza, a Caxcan from Durango. She also published Alto!, a book which stressed Mexican Nationalism through indigenous roots and, even after the alleged extinction of the Caxcan people, is quoted as saying "We do not recognize the right of any race to impose its civilization upon us" as a way to promote indigeneity.

2000-Present 
Caxcan people continue to live in Zacatecas and in diaspora. They are currently attempting to regain legal access to their sacred mountain, Tlachialoyantepec (El Cerro de las Ventanas).

Notes 

Indigenous peoples of Aridoamerica
Indigenous peoples in Mexico
History of Zacatecas